Jeay Laal also known as Jeay Laal Thatta is a Pakistani football club based in Thatta, Pakistan. The team plays in the PFF League, second tier of Pakistan Football.

History 
On 4 March 2020, Sindh Normalization Committee organized preliminary round for 2020 PFF League Club Leg from 9 March. Six teams were announced including Jeay Laal. Jeay Laal won the final and qualified for 2020 PFF League Club Leg which was going to be held from 23 March but was postponed due to coronavirus in Pakistan.

After the league was restarted, Jeay Laal made its debut against Humma where they conceded a loss. They lost all their matches in the tournament and failed to win a match.

References 

Football clubs in Pakistan
Association football clubs established in 2020
2020 establishments in Pakistan
Football in Thatta